Bachelor of Business Management (BBM), sometimes known as a fundamentals in marketing, is an undergraduate program of four years. The BBM degree is designed to teach students the skills necessary to perform leadership roles in the business and corporate world. And it is usually classified into 4 majors: Marketing Management, Financial Management, Operational Management and lastly Human Resource Development Management.
It is called  as Commerce BSCom Bachelor of science in commerce

Program content
The Bachelor of Business Management program allows students to specialize in a specific academic area including:

 Business Law
 Ethics
 Entrepreneurship
 Finance
 Human Resource Management
 Management information systems
 Marketing
 Operations management
 Organizational Behavior
 Project Management
 Strategic Management
 Supply chain management
 International business
 Computer application for business
 Environment studies
 Management training & development
 Project work

Scope of Business Management 
There is a certain question in the mind of many individuals: What can I learn from business management? One of the best advantages of learning business management is that you are extending yourself to build new areas of business development. The ability to adapt to any market environment can be built easily. In this way, in the industry, they are absorbed, and the tangent of their growth often seems to be upward.

Business Management helps in increasing the number of the opportunity of entering and working in any industry at the managerial level, which keeps on adding to the scope of business management and the growth that comes with it.

One of the benefits of studying business management is that this stream isn't bound to any specific industry and its lessons can be actualized in various areas. The business manager has a very versatile work profile, giving a wide potential for growth in the career.

Also, this particular study does not restrict the applicant to a specific country or nation, since you are going for an internationally acclaimed education. Many business management schools also provide international exposure to their students, which can also open the door to overseas industries.

References

Business Management
Academic degrees of India